North Carolina Electrical Power Company Electric Generating Plant, also known as Elk Mountain Steam Generating Plant, is a historic power station located at Woodfin, Buncombe County, North Carolina.  It was built in 1916, and is a tall one-story, rectangular brick and concrete building.  It measures 78 feet wide and 165 feet long. It features a 250 foot tall original brick smokestack.

It was listed on the National Register of Historic Places in 1999.

References

Industrial buildings and structures on the National Register of Historic Places in North Carolina
Industrial buildings completed in 1916
Buildings and structures in Buncombe County, North Carolina
National Register of Historic Places in Buncombe County, North Carolina